Turbonilla compsa is a species of sea snail, a marine gastropod mollusk in the family Pyramidellidae, the pyrams and their allies.

Description
The shell grows to a length of 3.4 mm. It  is  small, opaque white, with  considerable  lustre. Its upper portion is much more abruptly  tapered  than the lower. The eight  whorls of the teleoconch are flattened. The transverse ribs are irregularly developed due to an injury. There are about  30 narrow and, perpendicular ribs. They are straight on the upper whorls, becoming slightly curved above. The base of the shell is elongate, and well-rounded. The inner lip is straight and thickened.

References

External links
 To Biodiversity Heritage Library (2 publications)
 To Encyclopedia of Life
 To World Register of Marine Species
 

compsa
Gastropods described in 1899